The German-Hanoverian Party (DHP), also known as the Guelph Party, was a conservative, federalist political party in the German Empire and the Weimar Republic.

History
The party was founded in 1867 in protest of the annexation of the Kingdom of Hanover by the Kingdom of Prussia in the aftermath of the Austro-Prussian War. They wanted the revival of the Kingdom of Hanover and the restoration of the sequestrated assets of the former ruling House of Welf. The party therefore was also called the Welfen, and drew its strongest support from the rural areas around Hannover.

In the Reichstag DHP deputies usually acted as allies of the anti-Prussian Centre Party parliamentary group under Ludwig Windthorst, who although a Catholic and leader of the Centre Party was a former Hanoverian Justice Minister who was loyal to the House of Welf. From 1890 the party was led by Georg von der Decken.

After the proclamation of German Empire, the imperial authorities had failed to produce to an integrated society, despite the rapid industrialization that took place during the Wilhelmine era. Occupational, religious and regional identities prevailed over a unitary German one, and "bonds of unity that did exist were provided by the artificial dominance of Prussia". As such, the DHP appealed to the regional pride of the voters, and showed lack of integration of Hannover into Prussia and thus Germany, as the Hanoverian population felt alienated from Berlin. The main voter base of the German-Hanoverian party was former nobility, small businesses, public officials and Lutherans; many groups of the Hanoverian society lost a handful of priveleges upon their annexation to Prussia, and the local industry suffered as the local businesses were forced to compete with Prussian junkers as well. As such, many despised the Hanoverian loss of independence. The party also found support among other groups, such as Roman Catholics, who were persecuted by the now-dominating Prussian authorities. The Catholic population was deeply opposed to the unification of Germany and feared further persecution and identity loss in a Protestant-dominated Germany. The party also enjoyed support of Hanoverian craftsmen and artisans, whose guilds and unions were undermined by the annexation, and of industrial workers, who had to deal with worse conditions as the local industry suffered.

The party won 45.2 % of Hanoverian vote in the February 1867 North German federal election, and won 9 seats in the Reichstag. The DHP performed especially well in rural areas, while also dominating the city of Hanover thanks to the support of the industrial working class. Lastly, the party also performed well in Roman Catholic areas, such as the Duchy of Meppen-Lingen. In 1980, the regionalist supporters met in the city of Einbeck, where Hannoverscher Wahlverein responsible for picking election candidates was proclaimed. The party mainly focused on cultivating its strenght in rural areas, advocating protectionist measures to protect the Hanoverian agriculture and combat competition from Prussian landowners. The party appealed to the regionalist sentiment by reminding voters of "good times" before 1866, such as lower taxes under independent Hanover. One of the main element of the DHP's campaign was its newspaper Deutsche Volkszeitung, which maintained a small circulation of 6000 copies sold daily. The party was also supported by unrelated regionalist newspapers, such as the Deutsch-Hannoversche Volkskalender. Throghout the 19th century, the German-Hanoverian Party remained strictly separatist and campaigned mainly on local issues, while only commenting on national developments from a Hanoverian perspective. 

The DHP was closely associated with Ludwig Windthorst, who used to be a minister in independent Hanover. Despite supporting and campaigning for DHP, Windthorst never joined the party, and focused on building an all-Catholic coalition, becoming a co-founded of the Catholic Centre Party in the process. Once the Centre Party entered politics, the DHP cooperated with it; both parties were opposed to étatism and Prussian taxation, while also seeking a more decentralised German union and the preservation of confessional schools. As such, the German-Hanoverian Party condemned the Kulturkampf and spoke in favour of Roman Catholic interests. Despite its conservative outlook, the DHP also opposed the Anti-Socialist Laws, as many of the party members "felt a genuine obligation to protect the working class and thus found it expedient to cooperate with the SPD". The party deputies also opposed and criticised the colonial policies of Germany, voting against army expansions and condemning colonial expansion as the cause of diplomatic tensions with other colonial empires.

The party suffered a severe decline in the early 20th century, as its "clerical-proletarian-agrarian coalition" began to break down. Industrial workers started flocking to the SDP as industrialisation progressed, while many landed proprietors and small businesses switched to the German Agrarian League. Lastly, the party also lost the support of local Roman Catholics as it severed its ties to the Catholic Centre Party in 1912. The main reason for the decline, however, was the transformation of Hanover from a rural nation into a heavily industrialised one, which eroded the party's overwhemingly rural base.

During the German Revolution of 1918–1919, the DHP advocated the implementation of a Free State of Hanover within the Weimar Republic. It succeeded in having a plebiscite held in the Prussian Province of Hanover on 19 May 1924. However, the referendum fell short of the one-third threshold required to enact devolution, with 25.5 per cent in favour. According to Evan Bukey, the result nevertheless showed that many Hanoverians remained alienated from Germany, and "continued to maintain their regional loyalty and to feel uncomfortable in the German state". However, the defeat at the referendum hastened the party's decline, and in the following years many members joined the rising Nazi Party, others the Catholic Centre. In 1933 the DHP, like other conservative and liberal parties, dissolved to prevent a ban by the Nazi regime.

After World War II, a party called Niedersächsische Landespartei ("Lower Saxon State Party") was formed as a continuation of the DHP. From 1947 that party was known as the German Party (DP). By the time of 1953, a group of DP dissidents formed a new DHP, which again joined the remnants of the German Party in 1962.

See also
Guelphic Legion

References

Bibliography
 Hans Prilop: Die Vorabstimmung 1924 in Hannover. Untersuchungen zur Vorgeschichte und Geschichte der Deutsch-Hannoverschen Partei im deutschen Kaiserreich und in der Weimarer Republik. phil. Diss., Hamburg: Universität, 1954.

Political parties established in 1867
Political parties of the German Empire
Defunct regional parties in Germany
Political parties in the Weimar Republic
Political parties disestablished in 1933
1867 establishments in Germany
1933 disestablishments in Germany
Protestant political parties